A number of events in history are known as the siege of Magdeburg, including:

Siege of Magdeburg (1631) or Sack of Magdeburg, a siege followed by plundering and extensive destruction of the German city by the forces of the Holy Roman Empire and Catholic League during the Thirty Years' War.
Siege of Magdeburg (1806), a siege of the German city by forces of the First French Empire during the War of the Fourth Coalition, resulting in the surrender of a Prussian garrison
Siege of Magdeburg (1809),  a siege of the German city by a Prussian partisan force under Ferdinand von Schill during the War of the Fifth Coalition, resulting in the defeat of a French garrison
Siege of Magdeburg (1813–1814), a siege of the German city by forces of the First French Empire during the War of the Sixth Coalition, which ended with Napoleon's abdication

Magdeburg